Yusuf Khel, along with the Daulat Khel, Khulozai, Maghdud Khel, Mahmud Khel, Mahsud Khel and Umar Khel, is a sub-division of the Kakazai, Tarkanis/Mamund tribe of the Pashtuns located in Afghanistan and Pakistan.

References

"A Dictionary of the Pathan Tribes of the North West Frontier of India" published by The General Staff Army Headquarter, Calcutta, India - (Originally Published 1910) :: Kakazai / Kakayzai Pathan Tribe is mentioned on Page 22 (under ‘K’ - Kakazai), Page 12 (under ‘D’ - Daulat Khel - A sub-division of Kakazai Pathans), Page 26 (under 'K' - Khulozai - A sub-division of Kakazai Pathans), Page 29 (under ‘M’ - Maghdud Khel, Mahsud Khel and Mahmud Khel - sub-divisions of Kakazai Pathans), Page 47  (under 'U' - Umar Khel - A sub-division of Kakazai Pathans) and Page 50 (under 'Y' - Yusuf Khel - A sub-division of Kakazai Pathans)

Pashtun tribes